Thomas Beesley Sr. House is located in the Beesley's Point section of Upper Township, Cape May County, New Jersey, United States. The house was built in 1816 and was added to the National Register of Historic Places on December 17, 1992.

See also
National Register of Historic Places listings in Cape May County, New Jersey

References

Federal architecture in New Jersey
Houses on the National Register of Historic Places in New Jersey
Houses completed in 1816
Houses in Cape May County, New Jersey
National Register of Historic Places in Cape May County, New Jersey
Upper Township, New Jersey
1816 establishments in New Jersey
New Jersey Register of Historic Places